Hamaland (also Hameland) was a medieval Carolingian vassal county in the east of the modern-day Netherlands. Its name originated from the former Chamavi inhabitants that merged into the newly formed confederation of Franks. It is located east of the river IJssel and south of Salland (the original homeland of the Frankish Salii) and Twente (the original homeland of the Germanic Tuihanti). Hamaland and the Chamavi had since late antiquity been ruled by independent kings, before being subdued by the Carolingian Franks.

History
From the 9th century there was a Duchy of Hamaland, the rulers of which owned large parts of the middle, east and north of what is now the Netherlands. The same family also owned a large part of German Münsterland and more southerly estates, probably around Nassau. When the ruling Counts died out Hamaland became one of the core areas of the Dukes of Guelders, and thus became part of the Duchy of Guelders. Other lineages of the Hama-family became prominent in the Duchy of Cleve and the Bishoprics of Utrecht and Münster.

Nowadays Hamaland is part of the Dutch province Gelderland.

Former polities in the Netherlands
Duchy of Guelders
Achterhoek